The Early Life and Adventures of Sylvia Scarlett, often shortened to Sylvia Scarlett, is a 1918 novel by the British writer Compton Mackenzie. The heroine of the story had previously appeared in Mackenzie's Sinister Street. It was followed by a sequel Sylvia and Michael in 1919.

Adaptation
In 1935 it was made into an American film Sylvia Scarlett directed by George Cukor and starring Katharine Hepburn, Cary Grant, Edmund Gwenn and Brian Aherne.

References

Bibliography
 Goble, Alan. The Complete Index to Literary Sources in Film. Walter de Gruyter, 1999.
 Orel, Harold. Popular Fiction in England, 1914-1918. University Press of Kentucky, 1992.

1918 British novels
Novels by Compton Mackenzie
British novels adapted into films